Rise is the third album by American singing duo René & Angela, released on April 29, 1983. It was their last release for Capitol Records. The album includes the R&B ballad "My First Love".

Track listing
Written by Rene & Angela.
"Rise" – 3:57 	
"Keep Runnin'" – 5:16 	
"My First Love" – 5:07 	
"Bangin' the Boogie" – 5:01 	
"When It Comes to Love" – 5:01 	
"Wait Until Tonight" – 4:20 	
"Can't Give You Up" – 4:01 	
"Take Me to the Limit"	– 4:16

Personnel
Angela Winbush – Lead & Backing Vocal, Keyboards
René Moore – Keyboards, Bass, Lead & Backing Vocal
Jeff Lorber, Ian Underwood – Keyboards
Gregory Moore, Michael McGloiry, Tony Maiden, George Johnson, Mario Henderson – Guitars
Louis Johnson, Bobby Watson – Bass
Andre Fischer, Jeff Porcaro, John Robinson, Ollie Brown – Drums
Paulinho Da Costa – Percussion

Chart history

Albums

Singles

External links
 René & Angela-Rise at Discogs

References

1983 albums
Capitol Records albums
René & Angela albums